Marco Hidalgo (born 13 December 1959) is a Costa Rican sports shooter. He competed in the mixed 25 metre rapid fire pistol event at the 1980 Summer Olympics.

References

1959 births
Living people
Costa Rican male sport shooters
Olympic shooters of Costa Rica
Shooters at the 1980 Summer Olympics
Sportspeople from San José, Costa Rica
20th-century Costa Rican people